State Route 5 (abbreviated SR 5) is a state highway in Maine that runs from an intersection with State Route 9 in Old Orchard Beach, to an intersection with State Route 120 in Andover.

Route description

From its southern terminus near the Pier in Old Orchard Beach, SR 5 leaves the town to the west, going towards the neighboring city of Saco. The route runs northwest from Saco, passes very briefly through a Northwest corner of Biddeford, and intersects US 202 (US 202) near the Lyman-Waterboro line. SR 5 runs concurrently with US 202 for a short distance to East Waterboro.

Between Waterboro and Cornish, SR 5 is known as the Sokokis Trail. North of Cornish, the highway follows the Saco River, crossing it at Hiram, to the town of Fryeburg.  SR 5 continues north through Lovell to Bethel, where it intersects US 2. The two routes run together along the Androscoggin River to Rumford Point in the town of Rumford, where SR 5 leaves to the north. It follows parallel to the west bank of the Ellis River to the route's end in Andover.

History
As designated in 1925, SR 5 was a longer route than it is today, originally terminating in South Arm near the southern part of Lower Richardson Lake.  In 1980, it was cut back to its current northern terminus in Andover at the intersection with SR 120.

In the early 1980s, Interstate 195 (I-195) was being constructed in Saco, partially over the existing alignment of SR 5. The route was shifted alongside I-195 and partially cosigned with US 1.  This remains the routing today.

Junction list

Former auxiliary route

State Route 5A was a short  loop off Route 5 in Lovell. It functioned as an eastern bypass of downtown and connected to SR 5 at both ends. It was designated in 1960 and was removed from the route logs in 2003. It is now an unnumbered road.

References

External links

Maine State Route log via floodgap.com: Maine State Route 5

005
Transportation in York County, Maine
Transportation in Cumberland County, Maine
Transportation in Oxford County, Maine